Thomas Roberts Jernigan (1847–1920) was US consul in Kobe, Japan (1885–1889), and later US consul general in Shanghai, China (1893–1897). After leaving the diplomatic service he was Standard Oil Company's attorney in China, and served as chairman of the Shanghai International Settlement.  From 1905, he went into private practice as a lawyer with Stirling Fessenden under the firm name Jernigan and Fessenden.

Jernigan Road (now, Xianxia Road (仙霞路)) in Shanghai was named after him. He wrote a number of works on Chinese economics.

Jernigan died in 1920 and was buried on a hill overlooking Nanjing.  He is remembered on a plaque in Raleigh, North Carolina (corner of W Cabarrus and S McDowell on the north west side of the Raleigh Convention Centre.)

Publications
"Banking, Currency and Land Tenure in the Chinese Empire", in A History of Banking in all the Leading Nations, vol. 4 (1896).
"A Hindrance to Our Foreign Trade", North American Review, Vol. 163, No. 479 (October 1896), pp. 438–447. Available from JSTOR
"Commercial Trend of China", North American Review, Vol. 165, No. 488 (July 1897), pp. 63–69. Available from JSTOR
China's Business Methods and Policy (1904). Available on Internet Archive
China in Law and Commerce (1905). Available on Internet Archive
Shooting in China (1908). Available on Internet Archive

References

1847 births
1920 deaths
China Hands
American consuls
American business writers
American expatriates in China
North Carolina state senators
Consuls general of the United States in Shanghai